Dennis "Dinny" Pails (4 March 1921 – 22 November 1986) was an Australian tennis champion.

Pails was born in England, but moved to Australia in 1922 at age 1. Pails won the men's singles championship at the Australian Championships in 1947. Pails defeated John Bromwich in the final in five sets: 4–6, 6–4, 3–6, 7–5, 8–6, saving a match point in the process. Pails played eight Davis Cup matches between 1946 and 1947, winning three matches and losing five.

Pails turned professional at the end of 1947. He played on the pro tour off and on for many years. Pails reached as high as World No. 6 in the 1947 amateur rankings, and Bud Collins ranked him the World No. 4 pro in 1948. According to tennis great and long-time promoter Jack Kramer, Pails beat Pancho Segura 41 to 31 matches in the 1948 tour, "but that was when Sego was still learning how to play fast surfaces." Kramer beat Pails "55 times with 1 draw, but somehow we were able to forget that off the court."

Grand Slam finals

Singles (1 title, 1 runner-up)

Doubles (1 runner-up)

References

External links
 
 
 

1921 births
1986 deaths
Australian Championships (tennis) champions
Australian Championships (tennis) junior champions
Australian male tennis players
English emigrants to Australia
Sportspeople from Nottingham
Grand Slam (tennis) champions in men's singles
Professional tennis players before the Open Era
Grand Slam (tennis) champions in boys' singles
Grand Slam (tennis) champions in boys' doubles
20th-century Australian people